The 1990 Philips Austrian Open, also known as the Austrian Open Kitzbühel, was a men's tennis tournament held on outdoor clay courts at the Kitzbüheler Tennisclub in Kitzbühel, Austria that was part of the ATP World Series of the 1990 ATP Tour. It was the 20th edition of the tournament and was held from 30 July until 5 August 1990. Unseeded Horacio de la Peña won the singles title.

Finals

Singles

 Horacio de la Peña defeated  Karel Nováček 6–4, 7–6(7–4), 2–6, 6–2
 It was de la Peña's only singles title of the year and 3rd of his career.

Doubles

 Javier Sánchez /  Éric Winogradsky defeated  Francisco Clavet /  Horst Skoff 7–6, 6–2

References

External links
 ITF tournament edition details

Austrian Open(tennis)
Austrian Open Kitzbühel
Austrian Open